Nevine el-Kabbaj (born 10 November 1965) is an Egyptian politician and the current Minister of Social Solidarity since December 2019, in succession to Minister Ghada Waly.

Before appointing, el-Kabbaj had served as an assistant solidarity minister for social protection and then a deputy solidarity.

References

 

Cairo University alumni
Women government ministers of Egypt
Social affairs ministers of Egypt
1965 births
Living people